Prema Entha Madhuram is an Indian Telugu language drama television series. It starred Sriram Venkat and Varsha HK. It airs on Zee Telugu and now available on digital platform ZEE5 before TV telecast. The series premiered on 10 February 2020.

Plot 
'Prema Entha Maduram' is a Telugu romantic TV series starring Varsha HK and Sriram Venkat. The love story revolves around a middle-aged businessman and a 20-year-old girl. Life brings them together.

Episode 1-130

TKR College invited Arya Vardhan as the chief guest. He decided to cycle to the college as his car was fined for breaking traffic rules. Unfortunately, his cycle got punctured, so he hitched a ride with an auto. During the ride, he met Anu, who was preparing a speech to welcome him in the college function. He was impressed by her philosophy of valuing even two rupees. Arya Vardhan used this philosophy by reducing the price of a 10rs recharge card to 8rs, which gave the company a huge profit. He also offered Anu a job in his company, and they started to develop feelings for each other. However, Anu's mother asked Arya Vardhan to convince Anu to marry her neighbor's nephew, Sampath.
Arya Vardhan asked anu to marry sampath, which made anu heart broken. An heart broken Anu agreed to marry Sampath. Later, Arya Vardhan discovered that Sampath's father, Raghupati, was using the marriage to get business relations with his company. He made Anu's family realise raghupati’s true intention, which led to the breaking of the marriage.
Arya Vardhan's best friend Jende, who is chief security officer of his company, warned him to stay away from Anu as he believed she could become the reason behind his downfall. So, Arya Vardhan decided to transfer Anu to another city Vizag, but he changed his mind upon realising his feelings for Anu and brought her back to Hyderabad.

Episode 131-200

Arya Vardhan hired Neel to work in his company, and he started getting close to Anu, which made her uncomfortable. However, Neel also started developing a bond with Anu's family. Arya wanted Anu to accompany him to London for a business trip, but Anu's father, Subbu, refused to let her go due to her exam preparations. As a result, Arya decided to go to London alone, but on the day of his departure, his enemy Jalandhar was released from jail with plans to attack Arya in London. Jende decided to keep Arya underground for a week to protect him. During this time, Anu and Arya missed each other as they could not communicate. Eventually, Arya decided to meet Anu at a restaurant, using a ploy to fool Jende's security. However, Jalandhar's sharpshooter set his sights on Arya at the restaurant. Fortunately, Jende intervened and saved Arya from the attack. 
Arya Vardhan gave Anu a pen as a gift before her exam, and he had put a GPS tracker in it to keep her safe from Jalandhar, who he knew could harm her. Meanwhile, Jalandhar tried to kidnap Anu and her friend Ramya, but Arya could track them down and foil his plan thanks to the GPS tracker in pen. Arya prepared tea for Anu during the exam preparations to help her stay focused. He wanted to propose to her after her exam, but Jende told him that Anu only loved his wealth. Arya challenged Jende that he would make him understand Anu's love for him one day. Jende warned Anu to stay away from Arya, and she decided to resign, but Arya convinced her not to quit her job. At office, Arya lost a tender because of Neel, whom he later discovered was working for Jalandhar to ruin him. However, Neel had a change of heart after seeing Anu's admiration for Arya.  Arya forgave Neel and sent him to Abroad for higher studies.

Episode 201-300

Anu's father, Subbu, had decided to arrange Anu's marriage with Neel and sought out Arya's opinion on the matter. This news was disheartening for Arya, as Paddu had previously asked him for Anu’s marriage with Sampath. It appeared that neither Paddu nor Subbu viewed Arya as the right choice for Anu, possibly due to his age. Jende informed Subbu about Neel's true identity, and Subbu thanked Jende and Arya for making him aware of Neel’s true identity. Feeling heartbroken, Arya decided to leave the country. At the airport, Anu appeared before him and confronted him about his decision to abandon her. Arya could not leave Anu alone and decided to stay.
Arya invited Anu to his house to celebrate his younger brother Neeraj and sister-in-law Mansi's wedding anniversary. However, when Anu saw a file about Rajanandini in the office, she fainted. Arya was worried when he saw Anu unconscious, but his friend Jende told him to go home for the party. Later, Anu regained consciousness and went to Arya's house. But security officer did not allow her to enter the party. Unfortunately, Jalandhar kidnapped Anu. But Arya managed to find her and shot Jalandhar to save Anu. 
Meera, the Vice President of Arya's Company, has feelings for Arya and decides to seek revenge against Anu. Meera planned to frame Anu for taking money to leak confidential information about the company's tender quotation. This caused Arya's company to lose the tender. However, Arya investigated the situation and found out that Meera was the one who had plotted against Anu.
Subbu convinced Anu to leave her job. So, Anu quit her job and started working at Nandini Textiles. However, Arya didn't know Anu is working there and decided to take over the company. While working at Nandini Textiles, Arya met Anu and made her promise to stay with him. Later on, Arya recognized Anu's abilities and made her the CEO of Nandini Textiles. When Subbu discovered that Anu is working at Arya's company, he wasn't happy. But Arya convinced him and got his support for Anu's decision to work at his company.
On a work trip to Pochampalli, Anu Arya got lost and spent the whole night in the forest. Raghupati clicked photos of Anu with Arya and used them to  blackmailed Anu unanimously. When Arya found out about this, he warned Raghupati.
Arya had promised his mother, Sarda Devi, that he would introduce her to the person whom he loves on her birthday. He gave a saree to Anu to wear at the party so he could introduce her to his mother. However, Anu gave the saree to Meera and wore a different outfit instead. This upset Arya, and he did not introduce Anu to his mother.

Episode 300-450

Arya decided to propose to Anu, and he went all out to make it special. He invited her to his home, where he had adorned it with beautiful flowers. Before he disclosed his feelings to her, he disclosed his first wife, Rajanandini's death. Anu appreciated his honesty and accepted his love. Arya proposed to her for marriage in a unique way by recollecting all their memories(check episode 325 to know how he uniquely proposed to her). Later, Arya and Anu informed Anu's mother, Paddu, about their relationship. Unfortunately, Paddu didn't approve due to the age gap and her high regard for Arya. This was distressing for Anu, and she attempted suicide. Meanwhile, Arya had a car accident while driving in a distracted state. The situation worsened when Anu required urgent medical attention due to her rare Bombay Blood group. Unfortunately, the doctor couldn't find any donors. Arya regains consciousness and finds out about Anu's condition. Since he also had Bombay Blood group, so he donated blood to save her life. The media got wind of their love story thanks to Raghupati. Subbu also came to know about it but initially disapproved of their marriage. However, he eventually accepted it, although not wholeheartedly.

Anu's looks and behavior during the pre-wedding photoshoot brought back memories of Rajanandini for Arya (as Anu is Rajanandini's reincarnation). On the wedding day, Jalandhar, who was Arya's enemy, attempted to persuade Meera to poison Anu, but Meera refused due to her moral principles imparted by Arya. However, Raghupati ultimately succeeded in poisoning Anu. During the wedding, Anu began to feel ill, and after the completion of the wedding, she eventually collapsed. She was admitted to the hospital and saved by the spirit of Rajanandini.

Cast 
 Sriram Venkat as Aryavardhan
 Varsha HK as Anu
 Ram Jagan as Keshav Zende
 Varsha as Manasi
 VJ Karam as Neeraj
 Jaya Lalitha as Sharada devi Aryavardhan's mother
 Anushree as Meera
 Manasa Manohar as Rajanandhini
 Sandeep as Sampath

Reception

Ratings

Adaptations

References

External links 
 
 Prema Entha Madhuram at ZEE5

Telugu-language television shows
2020 Indian television series debuts
Zee Telugu original programming